Jérôme Gay (born 9 February 1975) is a French ski jumper. He competed at the 1992 Winter Olympics and the 1998 Winter Olympics.

References

1975 births
Living people
French male ski jumpers
Olympic ski jumpers of France
Ski jumpers at the 1992 Winter Olympics
Ski jumpers at the 1998 Winter Olympics
Sportspeople from Haute-Savoie